Imbabura is a province located in the Andes of northern Ecuador.  The capital is Ibarra. The people of the province speak Spanish, and a large portion of the population also speaks the Imbaburan Kichwa variety of the Quechua language.

The volcano is located in the large Cotacachi Cayapas Ecological Reserve.

Imbabura Volcano is also located in the province.

Cantons 
The province is divided into six cantons. The following table lists each with its population at the 2001 census and 2010 census. its area in square kilometres (km²), and the name of the cantonal seat or capital.

Today
The governor of Imbabura is Paolina Vercoutere Quinche. She was appointed on 17 June 2022.

Demographics 
Ethnic groups as of the Ecuadorian census of 2010:
Mestizo  65.7%
Indigenous  25.8%
Afro-Ecuadorian  5.4%
White  2.7%  
Montubio  0.3%
Other  0.1%

See also 
 Cotacachi Cayapas Ecological Reserve
 Cuicocha
 Inca-Caranqui, archaeological site 
 Provinces of Ecuador
 Cantons of Ecuador
 Gustavo Pareja

References 

 

 
Provinces of Ecuador